Dance is the third album by Paul Motian to be released on the ECM label. It was released in 1977 and features performances by Motian with bassist David Izenzon and saxophonist  Charles Brackeen.

Reception
The Allmusic review by Scott Yanow awarded the album 4½ stars, stating, "Although drummer Paul Motian is the leader of this trio set with the brilliant bassist David Izenzon, it is Charles Brackeen, heard on tenor and soprano, who is generally the solo star. Motian's six originals (which include "Waltz Song," "Kalypso," "Asia" and "Lullaby") contain plenty of variety and generally live up to their titles. ".

Track listing
All compositions by Paul Motian
 "Waltz Song" - 7:06  
 "Dance" - 7:29  
 "Kalypso" - 4:17  
 "Asia" - 7:39  
 "Prelude" - 6:50
 "Lullaby" - 5:58  
Recorded September 1977

Personnel
Paul Motian - drums, percussion
David Izenzon - bass
Charles Brackeen - soprano saxophone, tenor saxophone

References

1977 albums
Paul Motian albums
ECM Records albums
Albums produced by Manfred Eicher